Carrie Kelley is a superheroine from Frank Miller's graphic novels Batman: The Dark Knight Returns (1986) and its sequels Batman: The Dark Knight Strikes Again (2001-2002) and The Dark Knight III: The Master Race (2015-2017). She becomes the new Robin in The Dark Knight Returns when she saves Batman's life. Later in The Dark Knight Strikes Again, she adopts the identity Catgirl, and in The Dark Knight III: The Master Race, she adopts the identity Batwoman. She was the first full-time female Robin in the history of the Batman franchise, though Julie Madison had passed off as Robin for a brief time in a Bob Kane story published in Detective Comics #49 in March 1941.

Navia Robinson portrays Carrie Kelley in Gotham Knights.

Publication history
According to Frank Miller, the idea to create Carrie Kelley was sparked by a conversation with superhero comics veteran John Byrne while they were flying to an Ohio comic convention. When Miller told Byrne he was writing a Batman story featuring an old and crankier Batman, Byrne recommended him to make Robin a girl and drew him a sketch. Miller liked the concept so much that he ultimately included it in The Dark Knight Returns.

Fictional character biography

The Dark Knight Returns
Carrie Kelley is a 13-year-old schoolgirl and scout whom Batman saves from a sadistic group of Mutant gang members on the night of his return from retirement. Idolizing the Dark Knight, she then spends her lunch money on a Robin outfit, sets out to attack petty con-men and to find Batman in the hope of becoming his partner. Kelley uses a slingshot and firecrackers as weapons. She also wears green-tinted sunglasses instead of a black domino mask. Prior to her beginning her training from Batman, she is already trained in gymnastics. Like most of the young characters in the book, she speaks in a futuristic slang that Miller credited colorist (and Miller's wife) Lynn Varley with helping to create.

Unlike the first and second Robins mentioned in the story, Kelley is not an orphan, but she appears to have rather ignorant and neglectful parents who are never actually seen—one of them mutters "Didn't we have a kid?" while their daughter is witnessing the fierce battle between Batman and the street gangs known as the Mutants. It is hinted through their dialogue that they were once activists and possibly hippies during the 1960s, but have since become apathetic stoners.

In the series, the government's banning of superhero activities and Jason Todd's death had led to the Dark Knight's retirement, but Batman accepts her as Robin when she saves his life just as he is on the verge of being killed by the unnamed Mutant Leader by jumping on him from behind and tearing at his eyes. She practically drags him back to the Batmobile and makes a sling for his arm out of part of her cape and a piece of pipe. He often threatens to fire her but she shows considerable ability and improvisation which impresses him enough to give her a stay of dismissal even when she disobeys his orders. The police, now led by newly appointed Commissioner Ellen Yindel folllowing James Gordon's retirement, takes a very poor attitude to Batman and his methods and issues a warrant for his arrest. When she sees Batman with Kelley leaping in mid-air and barely catching a passing hang-glider, Yindel adds child endangerment to the growing list of charges against Batman.

As Robin, Carrie plays a crucial part in tracking down and confronting the Joker who (at a fairground) has poisoned several children and planted a bomb on a roller coaster. While Batman goes after his age-old nemesis, Carrie manages to dispose of the bomb but gets into a tangle with Fat Abner, Joker's accomplice. As they grapple together, Abner is decapitated by an overhanging section of the track, driving Carrie momentarily into shock and tears, but recovering enough to rescue a seriously injured Batman from capture by the police and help heal his wounds with Alfred Pennyworth. Carrie also helps Batman restore order in Gotham after a nationwide blackout caused by a electromagnetic pulse with help from the Sons of Batman. Unnerved by Batman's activities, the United States government sends Superman to bring the Dark Knight down. As the big battle is about to start, Carrie delays Superman's arrival using the tank-like Bat-mobile and a slingshot, to which the Man of Steel simply replies "Isn't tonight a school night?" Using a variety of powerful weapons, including synthesised kryptonite, Batman manages to defeat Superman but "dies" in the process. It later emerges that he had faked his own death and Carrie unearthed Batman from his grave soon after he revived. They then go underground to the Batcave where, with Green Arrow, they set about training various teenage street gangs into an army in preparation to deal with people "worse than thieves and murderers."

The Dark Knight Strikes Again

Three years later, Kelley has begun calling herself "Catgirl". She still remains Batman's able second-in-command. She wears a skin-tight cat costume with a leopard pattern, and is now trained extensively in combat. Her equipment includes motorised rollerskates and an arm cannon that fires batarangs. Catgirl's main duty is to oversee an army of Batboys to help save the world from a police-state dictatorship, led by Lex Luthor and Brainiac. She leads them into battle, liberating imprisoned heroes such as the Atom and Flash. However, she also causes serious injury to a Batboy who exceeded her orders by maiming and killing a couple of police officers. She beats him up and tells the others to treat him but not bother with anesthetic. Once alone, however, she breaks down in tears but is offered a comforting hand by Batman. She has been referred to as "The daughter [Batman] never had" but also as "jailbait".

Carrie eventually comes into conflict with a supernatural man resembling Joker and attempts to kill the man with arrows, thermite, acid and C4. However, the man still returns to make an attempt on her life in the Batcave, turning out to be a genetically modified and now-homicidal Dick Grayson having resented her because he had been shoddily treated and dumped by Batman. Her lips are badly lacerated and several of her bones are broken in the fight. Thinking that she is about to die, she tells Batman that she loves him, with Batman later reflecting that he feels the same (Frank Miller clarified in an interview in the book Batman through the Ages that Batman saw Carrie as a daughter, meaning Carrie most likely saw Batman as a father figure). Batman, however, arrives and stalls Grayson long enough for Ralph Dibny to get Carrie to safety. It was noted that Carrie was developing feelings for Atom.

The Dark Knight III: The Master Race
Three years after being missing, Batman makes some appearances in Gotham for the first time. After a confrontation with the GCPD and Commissioner Yindel, Batman is apprehended and unmasked revealing it is Carrie Kelley under the cowl. She claims Bruce Wayne is dead. Later, Kelley tells Yindel the story about Batman passing on his bed after being beaten by a villain. While being transferred to Blackgate prison, Kelley remotely activates a tank that attacks the convoy and helps her escape, then she reunites with Wayne at the Batcave.

Kelley and Wayne see the news on the Kandorians, led by Quar, giving mankind three days to surrender to their demands and accept them as gods. Bruce and Carrie go to the Fortress of Solitude and wakes Superman, who has been sitting and covered by ice for three years. Carrie reunites with the Bat Boys Army while Batman and Superman defy Quar. After being defeated by Lara, Superman is encased in black matter by Quar, who turns to Gotham and demands they hand over Batman to them or face obliteration. Bruce presents Carrie, as a "graduation present", a green and purple Batgirl outfit and sends her on a mission to engage Aquaman’s help to find and free Superman.

After the Kryptonians are defeated, Carrie is attacked by Baal. She defends herself and using a slingshot and a small kryptonite rock she disfigures Baal's face. Lara confronts Carrie and it's about to kill her when Diana stops her. Carrie witness the fight between Diana and Lara, impressed by the power both of them show. Later, Batgirl finds out that Batman was killed by Quar before escaping. She talks to Yindel at the destroyed batsignal and tells her to get a new one to stay in touch. While discussing with The Flash in the Batcave, a younger Bruce comes back after being immersed by Superman in the Lazarus Pit.

While following a lead on a crime, Commissioner Yindel is captured by Bruno and the Jokers. She is saved by Batman and Batgirl. They then head to the desert where the Kryptonians are joining forces again and use a band of bats to confuse them, causing to disparately attack themselves, the rest are eliminated by the four remaining Quar's children. Superman, Batman and Batgirl then attack them but they go nuclear and are about to explode when The Atom appears and reduces them in size so the explosions are insignificant.

Two months later, Superman is nowhere to be found and Bruce wonders where he could be. Carrie shows up with a new black suit and formally becomes Batwoman.

The New 52 
In September 2011, The New 52 rebooted DC's continuity. On Prime Earth, Carrie Kelley makes her first appearance in Batman and Robin #19 (titled Batman and Red Robin).  She is a college student and Damian Wayne's acting instructor. As a homage to The Dark Knight Returns, she wears a Robin costume as a Halloween costume on her first appearance.

DC Rebirth 
In Batman Annual #2 in a world where Batman and Catwoman have grown old together, Carrie is among the Bat family members standing by Bruce's bedside as he dies.

Other versions
 In The Batman & Robin Adventures #6, a tabloid spreads the rumor that Batman is seeking a new partner to serve as Robin, resulting in several imitators donning the Robin costume and taking to the streets in attempts to impress Batman. Among them is a redheaded female who uses a small bomb to interrupt a meeting between Batman, Robin, Commissioner Gordon and Detective Bullock, and announces her name as Carrie. Bullock arrests her, but she is released from jail due to her city councilman father. Carrie tails Batman for the rest of the issue, continually causing problems with the kidnapper of another Robin pretender who expects a solitary meeting with Batman.
 Carrie Kelley appears in the Ame-Comi Girls books as the Robin of that universe. In this continuity, she is the cousin of Barbara Gordon to whom she acts as a sidekick. When Batgirl is kidnapped by Duela Dent, Carrie enlists the aid of Steel and the Flash to help rescue Batgirl.
 In Batman: The Brave and the Bold #13, the Phantom Stranger summons all of the Robins, including Carrie, Stephanie Brown, Nightwing, Tim Drake, Damian Wayne, and Jason Todd to save Batman. Throughout the issue, she constantly uses slang words from The Dark Knight Returns, like "shiv", or "billy." Nightwing notes that Carrie may not have as much physical strength as the other Robins, but she makes up for it in enthusiasm and attitude.

In other media

Television
 Carrie Kelley appears in The New Batman Adventures episode "Legends of the Dark Knight", voiced by Anndi McAfee. She is a young girl in the present time that describes what she (as Robin) envisions Batman as being like as the fantasy is a re-enactment of Batman's fight with the Mutant Leader.
 The Carrie Kelley version of Robin appears in the Teen Titans Go! episode "The Best Robin", voiced by Scott Menville. She is part of a team of Robins that eventually becomes consumed by competition to determine which Robin is the best one.
 Carrie Kelley makes an uncredited cameo in the Titans episode "Barbara Gordon" as she appears in a file on the Batcomputer for replacement Robins including Stephanie Brown and Duke Thomas which is discovered by Dick Grayson (Brenton Thwaites) after the death of Jason Todd (Curran Walters).
 Carrie Kelley appears in The CW series Gotham Knights portrayed by Navia Robinson. While her history of becoming Robin remains intact, this version is the trigonometry classmate of Bruce Wayne's adoptive son Turner Hayes at the time when Bruce was found dead. When Turner is accused of hiring Harper Row, Cullen Row, and Duela in the murder of Bruce which they didn't commit, Carrie saves them from some corrupt police officers that wanted them dead before they can be locked up at Blackgate Penitentiary. With Turner remembering Carrie, she helps them in finding out who framed them.

Film
 The Carrie Kelley version of Robin appears in the two-part animated adaptation of Batman: The Dark Knight Returns, voiced by Ariel Winter.
 The Dick Grayson version of Robin in The Lego Batman Movie is visually based on the Carrie Kelley and Tim Drake versions of Robin, with their suits being visible within Batman's Batcave.

Miscellaneous
Carrie Kelley/Robin appears in a one-page article in Comics Collector #8 (Krause Publications, Summer 1985), predating her first comic book appearance.

References

Comics characters introduced in 1986
DC Comics female superheroes
DC Comics superheroes
DC Comics martial artists
DC Comics sidekicks
Fictional inventors
Fictional women soldiers and warriors
Characters created by Frank Miller (comics)
Teenage characters in comics
Robin (character)
Batman characters